Midwest Airlines was an airline based in Cairo, Egypt, operating chartered passenger flights within Egypt and to Europe. It has since ceased all operations.

History
Midwest Airlines was founded in 1998 with an initial fleet of two Airbus A310-300s. Of those, one was sold in 2004, while the other one is stored.

From its beginning, the airline offered charter services from Egyptian holiday resorts to Europe and the Middle East on behalf of local and international tour operators. Due to circumstances attributable to the then owners, the airline stopped operations in 2006. The sale of the company was formalized in May 2009, followed by more acquisitions of shares, and a restructuring and reorganization of the company was effectively started in September 2009. Concerted efforts during 2009 brought Midwest back into the air operations scene. A Boeing 737-800 was dry leased, which enabled the airline to renew its AOC.

Fleet
The Midwest Airlines fleet consists of the following aircraft (as of February 2013):

References

External links

Defunct airlines of Egypt
Airlines established in 1998
Airlines disestablished in 2013
Defunct charter airlines
Companies based in Cairo
2013 disestablishments in Egypt
Egyptian companies established in 1998